Crossiella is a genus in the phylum Actinomycetota (Bacteria).

Etymology
The name Crossiella derives from: New Latin named for Thomas Cross, a microbiologist at the University of Bradford, who made many contributions to actinomycete biology and systematics.

Species
The genus contains two species, namely
 C. cryophila ( (Labeda and Lechevalier 1989) Labeda 2001,  (type species of the genus); Greek kruos, icy cold, frost; New Latin philus from Greek philos (φίλος) meaning friend, loving; New Latin cryophila, cold-loving, referring to the low permissive temperature range for growth.)
 C. equi ( Donahue et al. 2002, ; Latin equi, of the horse, referring to the source of isolation of this microorganism, equine placentas.)

See also
 Bacterial taxonomy
 Microbiology

References

Bacteria genera
Actinomycetota